The ESJ or École supérieure de journalisme (in English: Tertiary college of Journalism) is an institution of higher education and French Grande École dedicated to the study of Journalism. It has three sites in France: 
ESJ Lille
ESJ Montpellier is linked to the ESJ Lille
ESJ Paris is still independent from the two others

Grands établissements
Journalism schools in France